Egor Igorevich Anisimov (born 31 August 1987, Kaliningrad) is a Russian politician of the Liberal Democratic Party of Russia. He was a member of the State Duma in the 6th convocation, and is currently a deputy of the Kaliningrad Oblast Duma.

Biography 
Born on 31 August 1987 in Kaliningrad. In 2013, he became a member of the State Duma, having accepted the mandate of the deceased in the court of auditors Maksim Rokhmistrov. He was also a member of the State Duma Committee on Education.

Bills 
Anisimov introduced a patriotic bill No. 763042-6 "On measures to counter sanctions of foreign States in the field of culture and on amendments to the Russian Code of administrative offences." Under the bill, the Duma is considering banning all films from all countries that have imposed sanctions against the Russian Federation. The first article of the bill formulates a ban on the rental and showing of foreign films, the second article introduces administrative liability of legal entities and physical persons for violation of this prohibition. The suggested fine for individuals is 2,500 rubles (US$), and releasing companies could face a fine of 40 to 50 thousand rubles (up to US$).

References

External links 
 Biography on the website of the Kaliningrad regional Duma

1987 births
Living people
Liberal Democratic Party of Russia politicians
Sixth convocation members of the State Duma (Russian Federation)
Politicians from Moscow
21st-century Russian politicians